Dinamo Stadium is a multi-purpose stadium in Bucharest, Romania.  It is currently used mostly for football matches and is the home ground of Dinamo București.

History
The stadium was built in 1951. First match played here was Dinamo – Locomotiva Timișoara 1–0, on 14 October 1951.

In 2001, floodlights were added, and in 2006 a major renovation of the stadium began, enlarging the VIP section, and raising the capacity of the Tribune 2 stand.  However, due to lack of funding the renovation has still not been completed. There are now plans to build a new arena, but administrative problems make progress very slow-going. New seats and a new scoreboard were added. Many important matches were held here including Dinamo against Everton and Bayer Leverkusen.

In April 2001, as the ground was broken during the work for the stadium's first renovation, a Second World War shell was discovered and extracted from a pit 20 meters away from the stands.

Romania national football team
The following national team matches were held in the stadium:

Gallery

See also

List of football stadiums in Romania

References

 

Football venues in Romania
Sports venues in Bucharest
Rugby union stadiums in Romania
Multi-purpose stadiums in Romania
FC Dinamo București
Sports venues completed in 1952
1952 establishments in Romania